"Aalaporaan Thamizhan"() is a 2017 Indian Tamil language song composed by A. R. Rahman, from the music album of Mersal. The song's lyrics were written by Vivek and sung by Kailash Kher, Sathyaprakash, Pooja AV, and Deepak. The song's music video is pictured upon actor Vijay. The song was released as first single track of the film on 10 August 2017. As of October 2020, the video song has grossed 155 million of views in YouTube. The song portrays about the popularity of Tamil speaking people all over the world. The song features Vijay as Vetrimaaran, praising Tamil heritage and pride following a wrestling match in Punjab.

Song credits 
Personnel

 Composer & Producer - A. R. Rahman
 Lyrics - Vivek
 Performers - Kailash Kher, Pooja Vaidyanath, D. Sathyaprakash, Deepak Blue
 Additional Vocals - Veena Murali, Maalavika, Deepthi Suresh, Soundarya, Anu Subbhaiya, Vishnupriya, Yaamini, Aishwarya Kumar

Musician

Flute - Naveen Kumar
Guitars - Keba Jeremiah
Nadaswaram - D. Balasubramani
Sitar - Kishore
Indian Rhythm - T Raja, Kumar, Lakshmi Narayanan, Raju, Vedha, Neelakandan, 
Thavil - M Venkatesh Subramanian, Kaviraj, S Sundar, Purushothaman
Kombu - Alex, Kali, Shankar, Viji
Live Strings - Chennai Strings Orchestra, Sunshine Orchestra (conducted by V J Srinivasamurthy)

Sound Engineers

Panchathan Record Inn, Chennai - Suresh Permal, Karthik Sekaran, T R Krishna Chetan, Srinidhi Venkatesh, Jerry Vincent, Santhosh Dhayanidhi, Vinay Sridhar, Ishaan Chhabra
AM Studios, Chennai - S Sivakumar, Kannan Ganpat, Krishnan Subramanian, Pradeep Menon, Manoj Kumar

Production

Additional Programming - T R Krishna Chetan, Kumaran Sivamani, Santhosh Dayanidhi, Hari Dafusia, Pawan CH, Kaashif AH, Jim Sathya
Choral Arrangement - Arjun Chandy, Nakul Abhyankar
Additional Choral Supervisor - Srinivas Doraiswamy
Mixed by - T R Krishna Chetan
Mastered by - Suresh Permal
MfiT - S. Sivakumar
Musicians Coordinators - Vijay Iyer, Noel James, TM Faizuddin
Musicians Fixer - Samidurai R
Music Label - Sony Music Entertainment India Pvt. Ltd.

Reception

Critical reception
The Times of India stated that "[t]he song was released as the first single on August 10, 2017, and received massive applause from the audience. The number is all about Tamil pride, and that struck a chord with listeners. It used a lot of native instruments in the background score and Vivek’s lyrics spoke about the history and what it means to be a Tamizhan. Despite so many months, it remains a favourite among Vijay fans." Behindwoods wrote "Be it the folk beats, the indigenous instruments, the melodious portion delivered by Pooja or the native percussions, the song has a lot to offer. It is not an out and out mass number that is centred by folk elements but serves to be a song rich in a lot of aspects. With Rahman’s chords haunting the listener, Aalaporaan Tamizhan is an overall delight for both his fans and for fans of actor Vijay."

Views 

Aalaporaan Tamizhan has amassed 145 million views on YouTube.

Live performances

Mersal Audio Launch
 
On 1 September 2017, filmmakers launched Mersal  album on live program. A. R. Rahman performed the song live.

Concerts 
Netru Indru Naalai concert (12 January 2018), Chennai

Among all the songs played at Rahman's Netru Indru Naalai concert held in Chennai.

Awards and nominations

References 

2018 songs
Indian songs
Tamil film songs
Tamil-language songs
Songs with music by A. R. Rahman